Professor Jennie Elizabeth Pryce (born 1972) is a quantitative geneticist based in Melbourne, Australia. Jennie is the DairyBio animal program leader in conjunction with her role as principal research scientist for Agriculture Victoria and Professor of animal genetics at La Trobe University.

Early life and education 
Pryce was born in Shrewsbury, Shropshire, UK in 1972. She attended Shrewsbury High School and then the Cheltenham Ladies College.

Pryce became inspired by genetics through owning and breeding her pedigree, registered herd of Holstein dairy cattle, under the prefix of Severnvale Holsteins and decided from a young age to pursue a career in genetics. In 1994 she received BSc (Hons) 1st class from the University of Edinburgh, Scotland and a PhD in 1998 also from the University of Edinburgh in "The Genetics of Health and Fertility of Dairy Cattle" under the supervision of Professors Geoff Simm, William G. Hill, Robin Thompson and Roel Veerkamp.

Career 
Between 1998 and 2001 Pryce was a dairy geneticist with the Scotland's Rural College, Edinburgh, Scotland. In 2001 she moved to New Zealand to take up a scientist position with the breeding company Livestock Improvement Corporation. Since 2008 Pryce has lived and worked in Melbourne, Australia where her main areas of research interest are genetic improvement of functional traits (especially dairy cow fertility and feed conversion efficiency), optimising breeding scheme design under genomic selection and development of dairy selection indices.

Jennie is also a member of the International Committee for Animal Recording’s Functional Traits Working Group and the Feed and Gas Working group and was also section editor of Journal of Dairy Science, a member of the Functional Traits working group of the International Committee on Animal Recording (ICAR) and a member of the scientific committee of the World Congress on Genetics Applied to Livestock Production. In Australia, Pryce sits on the Dairy Moving Forward Fertility group and Holstein Australia's Breed Development and Conformation Committee.

Awards 

In 2016 Jennie was the first non-North American recipient of the prestigious American Dairy Science Association J.L. Lush Award for Animal Breeding and Genetics - established in 1982, the Award honours the memory of Dr J. L. Lush, who dedicated his life to advancing the field of animal breeding. In 2019, Jennie was named as Australia’s top researcher in the field of animal husbandry by research analytics firm League of Scholars; this award is based on number of citations for papers published in the top 20 journals in each field over the past 5 years. The winner must have done research work published in the 10 years immediately preceding the year of recognition, performed research in any area of animal breeding and genetics that had or has the potential for improvement of dairy cattle.

The 2018 Agriculture Victoria Awards category “Excellence in Scientific Impact” winner for ImProving Herds. ImProving Herds was an innovative and collaborative herd improvement research, development, extension and education project concluding in 2018. It was important because it spelt out the importance and role of herd improvement to dairy farmers and the broader dairy industry. It was significant because it quantified the economic importance of genetic improvement by comparing breeding indices to real economic farm data, which has only been done once before in the dairy sector. ImProving Herds culminated in one of Australia’s largest on-farm dairy events, “The National Muster” which was attended by over 300 farmers and advisors.

The 2019 Agriculture Victoria Awards category “Excellence in Scientific Impact” winner for “Excellence in Discovery and Invention” for Classifying the fertility of dairy cows using mid-infrared spectroscopy Drs Phuong Ho, Tim Luke and Jennie Pryce from Genomic and Cellular Sciences have developed a model that can predict how likely a dairy cow is to conceive to first insemination with up to 77 per cent accuracy.

The 2019 Agriculture Victoria Awards category “Excellence in Leadership” winner. This citation reads: “Professor Jennie Pryce is an outstanding nomination for the Leadership award category given the impact and dimensions of her leadership. She has provided outstanding and clear science leadership (scholarly and impact leadership), team leaderships, collaboration leadership nationally and international collaboration as well as industry translation and adoption. She is also an outstanding team, program and project leader and models agriculture values. Professor Pryce is highly skilled at communication and influence, and in clearly explaining complex science and evidence to academic peers and lay audiences. Jennie leads a major part of the most important innovation program for the Dairy Industry – DairyBio - making profitability improvements on farm. This innovation is critical to the dairy industry – regional Victoria’s largest employer and a $1 billion export industry for the state. Professor Pryce has led development and delivering of successful research, worked to build industry groups’ understanding and adoption, and led development of tools for direct benefit on farm by most farmers. Leading strong impact on the economy and society this year, Professor Pryce has been named Australia’s top researcher in the field of animal husbandry by research analytics firm League of Scholars and published in The Australian".

References

External links 
 
 
 
 
A long pedigree in genetics - https://dairybio.com.au/dairycattle/2019/11/27/a-long-pedigree-in-dairy-genetics/
Animal Genetic Improvement - Dr Jennie Pryce (Video)
World Congress Livestock Genetics - update by Dr Jennie Pryce (video)

Women geneticists
Australian women scientists
Living people
1972 births